Kristi Yuryevna Shashkina (born 9 January 2003) is an Estonian-Russian ice hockey player and member of the Russian national ice hockey team, currently playing in the Zhenskaya Hockey League (ZhHL) with Dinamo-Neva Saint Petersburg.

Playing career 
As a child, Shashkina played on boys' ice hockey teams of Kajakas Tartu sports club in her home city of Tartu, Estonia. At age 13, after being scouted at various tournaments abroad, she received and accepted an offer from the HC SKIF under-18 (U18) team in Nizhny Novgorod, a joint academic and athletic program for secondary school students. Two years later, Shashkina made her senior club debut with SKIF Nizhny Novgorod in the 2018–19 ZhHL season. She played two ZhHL seasons with SKIF before opting to play abroad with the ZHC Lions Frauen of the Swiss Women's League (SWHL A) for the 2020–21 season. She returned to the ZhHL in the 2021–22 season, signing with the newly re-established Dinamo-Neva Saint Petersburg.

International play 
As a junior player with the Russian national under-18 team, she participated in the 2019 IIHF Women's U18 World Championship and won a bronze medal at the 2020 IIHF Women's U18 World Championship.

Shashkina represented the Russian Olympic Committee at the 2021 IIHF Women's World Championship.

Personal life 
Shashkina’s elder brother, Denis Shashkin, represented  in the men's ice hockey qualification tournament for the 2022 Winter Olympics and at various international tournaments at the U18 and U20 levels.

References

External links
 

Living people
2003 births
Sportspeople from Tartu
Estonian ice hockey forwards
Russian women's ice hockey forwards
HC SKIF players
Estonian expatriate sportspeople in Switzerland
Estonian sportswomen
Estonian expatriate ice hockey people
Expatriate ice hockey players in Switzerland
Expatriate ice hockey players in Turkey
Estonian expatriate sportspeople in Turkey
Russian expatriate sportspeople in Switzerland
Russian expatriate sportspeople in Turkey